Johann Walther may refer to:
 Johann Walter (1495–1570), collaborator of Martin Luther in the Reformation
 Johann Jakob Walther (artist) (1604–1677) Strasbourg painter
 Johann Jakob Walther (composer) (1650–1704), German violinist and composer
 Johann Gottfried Walther (1684–1748), German music theorist and composer